Leiosyrinx immedicata is a species of sea snail, a marine gastropod mollusk in the family Raphitomidae.

Description
The length of the shell attains 43 mm.

Distribution
This marine species was found in deep water off the Solomon islands and New Caledonia.

References

 Bouchet, P. & Sysoev, A., 2001. Typhlosyrinx-like tropical deep-water turriform gastropods (Mollusca, Gastropoda, Conoidea). Journal of Natural History 35: 1693-1715

External links
 MNHN, Paris: specimen
 Gastropods.com: Leiosyrinx immedicata
 
 Intergovernmental Oceanographic Commission (IOC) of UNESCO. The Ocean Biogeographic Information System (OBIS)

immedicata
Gastropods described in 2001